Micka (* 2012) is a female domestic cat belonging to the President of the Czech Republic Petr Pavel. The cat frequently appeared in Pavel's media campaign during the 2023 Czech presidential election. Micka is likely to reside at Prague Castle.

The Czech public reacted very positively to Micka's inclusion in the campaign. Pavel stated that Micka, together with the flannel shirt, became one of his icons. Pavel classifies these elements as humorous but still worthy of representing his presidency.

According to the head of Petr Pavel's election campaign Pavla Nýdrlová, his team will strive to relocate the cat to Prague Castle. In that case, it would be the first pet to be officially housed at Prague Castle for a long time.

Life
According to Eva Pavlová, Micka was found with the assistance of the family's dog Bob during a snowdrift in December 2012. A long stay to adverse cold conditions caused Micka to lose a piece of her tail. She traveled regularly to Brussels with Petr Pavel and Eva Pavlová although she doesn't like traveling too much.

See also
 List of individual cats

References

Individual cats in politics
Petr Pavel
2023 Czech presidential election
Individual animals in the Czech Republic